Polar Night Halfmarathon is an annual half marathon running competition in Tromsø, Norway. It takes place in the beginning of January, during the Polar night-period, when the sun does not rise above the horizon. At almost 70° north, it is the northernmost AIMS-certified (Association of International Marathons and Distance Races) half marathon in the world. It is renowned for its torch-lit route and the chance of running underneath the aurora borealis.

Past winners
Key:

References

External links
  January 2010 race results

Half marathons